Jennifer Welsman was born in Penticton, British Columbia. At an early age, she got involved in dance at the Penticton School of Dance, later becoming a member of the Royal Winnipeg Ballet School in 1993.

In 2001, she had her first lead role in a ballet as Clara in The Nutcracker.  She also plays the China Doll in the Canadian-based kids show The Toy Castle. She has also danced Aurora in The Sleeping Beauty, Odette and Odile in Swan Lake, and Tiger Lily and Mrs. Darling in the ballet version of Peter Pan.

She married violinist Simon MacDonald in 2005 at Skaha Lake, British Columbia, Canada.

References

External links
Profile at Royal Winnipeg Ballet 

Year of birth missing (living people)
Living people
Canadian ballerinas
Canadian female dancers
People from Penticton
Royal Winnipeg Ballet soloists